The British Rail Class 52 is a class of 74 Type 4 diesel-hydraulic locomotives built for the Western Region of British Railways between 1961 and 1964. All were given two-word names, the first word being "Western" and thus the type became known as Westerns. They were also known as Wizzos and Thousands.

Historical context

When switching to diesel traction as part of the Modernisation Plan of the 1950s, British Railways (BR) designed, and commissioned designs for, a large number of locomotive types. At this time BR's regions had a high degree of autonomy, which extended as far as classes of locomotives ordered and even the design criteria for those locomotives. Whilst almost all other diesel locomotives were diesel-electric, the Western Region employed a policy of using diesel-hydraulic traction, originally commissioning three classes of main line locomotives: a type 2 and two type 4s (later designations Class 22, Class 41 and Class 42). With pressure to increase the speed of the transition from steam to diesel, volume orders for the Class 22 and Class 42 (along with a similar design Class 43) followed in 1957, a mere two years after the original orders and well before any idea of performance or reliability could be gained. At the same time it was realised that all the existing orders (diesel-electric and diesel-hydraulic) were for types 1, 2 and 4; thus orders were placed for 101 Type 3 diesel-hydraulics (later Class 35).

The theoretical advantage of diesel-hydraulic was simple: it resulted in a lighter locomotive than equivalent diesel-electric transmission. This provided a better power/weight ratio and decreased track wear. Unfortunately, it had several key disadvantages:

 The technology was proven in continental Europe, particularly Germany, but was new to the UK. At the time, it was considered politically unacceptable for the UK government to order railway rolling stock from foreign companies, especially German companies so soon after the Second World War. This resulted in most of the engines and transmissions being manufactured in the United Kingdom under licence from the German manufacturers.
 The most robust hydraulic transmissions were only capable of handling engines with power output of around 1,500 hp (1,120 kW); building  a more powerful locomotive would involve two diesel engines and two transmissions.
 The transmission had significantly higher power losses than diesel-electric, negating some of the benefits and resulting in considerably higher fuel consumption.

Experience showed that the Bristol-Siddeley-Maybach engines were superior to those made by North British Locomotive Company-MAN and although the use of twin engines in the same locomotive was new, the design did not produce any insurmountable problems. In the end the diesel-hydraulic experiment foundered on low fleet numbers, poor maintenance conditions and design issues; not on its German heritage or development of a novel configuration. BR's Swindon Works maintained all the diesel-hydraulic locomotives, and their early demise resulted in a much reduced workload and hastened its eventual closure in 1986.

The Western 

With the Hymeks and Warships already in service but proving underpowered for top-link services, BR Western Region needed a high-powered locomotive for these trains – the Western therefore needed two diesel engines to achieve the required power output. In keeping with their policy, a new locomotive with a hydraulic transmission was envisaged. Experience had shown that the Maybach engines in the Hymeks were superior to the earlier Maybach and MAN engines used in the Warships, particularly in power output. Also Maybach were able to offer their 12 MD engines rated at  allied to a Voith transmission; a Mekydro transmission designed to handle such power could not be fitted into the British loading gauge.

Prototypes sited the engines behind the driving cabs but drivers found this too noisy; moving the engines centrally meant making the locomotive heavier, removing some of the design's advantage. In operational use, the dual-engine arrangement turned out to have some advantages: in particular, the Westerns were able to continue operating with a single engine running in situations where more conventional single-engine designs would require rescue by another locomotive.

The most serious continual problem with the class was a mismatch between the Maybach MD655 engines and the Voith L630rV three speed hydraulic transmissions, a design fault. The top gear ratio in the transmission was too high for the torque characteristics of the engine: the result was that a single locomotive could struggle to reach its claimed  top speed in the absence of down grades, more so when work-weary and due for overhaul. This factor, the South Devon Banks (a major part of their running grounds) and the deleterious effect on worn-out engines, all contributed against the Westerns continuing in top-line service. With fifty Class 50 locomotives becoming available following completion of the West Coast Main Line electrification, and new High Speed Trains, the speed and comfort increases the Western Region sought could be achieved and the Westerns dispensed with. Towards the end of their careers, the Westerns were all allocated to Laira (Plymouth).

Competition and comfort 

Whilst the design was largely successful, the working life of the class was relatively short. Its non-standard design added to its maintenance costs at a time when national British Rail policy was moving away from diesel-hydraulics. When the Westerns were introduced in 1962, the Western Region had 226 diesel-hydraulics and 10 diesel-electrics (excluding shunters); by 1966, the numbers were 345 and 269 respectively. As a result, the early 1970s saw the decision taken to retire all the diesel-hydraulic types. Class 46s and Class 47s took over passengers and heavy freight, Class 31s and Class 37s took over light passengers and freight, and   Class 25s covered the lighter duties. Following completion of the electrification of the West Coast Main Line throughout from London to Glasgow, the Class 50s were reallocated to the Western Region; the introduction of High Speed Trains three years later was the final nail in the coffin for the Class 52 Westerns.

In 1968–69, the Westerns received train air brake equipment in addition to their vacuum exhausters, thus significantly extending their working lives, unlike the similar but lower-powered, Warship class.  Four of the class (D1017–D1020) did not receive dual brakes, with these locomotives being among the first withdrawals. The vacuum brake equipment was retained and to fit the additional equipment, it was necessary to remove one of the fuel tanks. However, as with the Warships, it proved impossible to equip them with electric train heating (ETH, or head-end power in US terminology). The Western Region faced particularly stiff competition for its prime inter-city services in the mid to late 1970s from the M4 motorway and it was generally felt within BR that significant speed and comfort improvements on the prime London Paddington-Bristol route were necessary. The lack of ETH meant the Westerns could not power the newly introduced air-conditioned BR Mark 2d/e/f coaches – a shortcoming that classes 47 and 50, equipped with ETH (the latter from new), did not share.

Performance 
The highest recorded speed with a Western that O. S. Nock was aware of was  when D1068 hauled nine coaches (305 tons gross) down 1 in 1,320 (i.e. virtually level) at Southall. An unverified eyewitness account by a BR secondman stated that   had been achieved when his driver drove a Western between Reading and Westbury. He experienced the locomotive shaking from side to side as 110 mph was indicated on the speedometer.

However, when it came to drawbar horsepower the Westerns in some respects were less capable than the equivalent diesel electric locomotives. Nock states "whilst the Westerns took their rightful place as fast and powerful locomotives it became evident that they were showing the same deficiency in actual power put forth at the drawbar as the [diesel-hydraulic] Warships had done. The highest output that came to my notice was a sustained  hauling 560 tons descending 1 in 1,320, which equates to 1,500 edhp (equivalent drawbar horsepower)". This is 56% of power at the flywheel, whereas for a diesel-electric one would normally expect a figure of 75 to 80%. A similar result was obtained when Clough & Beckett compared the performance of type 4 diesel locomotives (Classes 45/46/47/50/52) hauling trains up the ascent to Whiteball summit. They deliberately chose data to show each class in their best light and included a Western run which produced 1,775 edhp but they still concluded that "without doubt the Westerns get the wooden spoon; certainly not what one would expect from units of 2,700 bhp". The best performer was the Class 50, a  diesel-electric locomotive: on one run this achieved 2,115 edhp.

Despite this apparent limitation, the BR Western Region load-limit book gave the same 550 ton loading figure for both the Class 52 and Class 47 diesels over the South Devon banks between Newton Abbot and Plymouth. The reason for this is that, while the diesel-electric classes could produce high maximum tractive effort for limited periods, diesel hydraulics could produce significantly higher continuous tractive effort.

Names and numbers 

While the first Western was under construction, proposals for livery and names were prepared by the BR design panel. The D1000 series locomotives were to be named after famous West of England place names; the illustration from the portfolio shows D1000 bearing the name Cheddar Gorge. This was not followed in production, however, and the Westerns were named with general heraldic and regimental terms prefixed with the word "Western" as per the following table.

Of the 74 locomotives built, 7 have survived to preservation.

D1029 was originally named Western , but renamed Western Legionnaire in 1969, the nameplate being cut to allow the additional letter to be inserted.

Although designated Class 52 under the TOPS scheme and all were still in service when TOPS was introduced in 1973, no Western ever carried its "52 0xx" TOPS number. As withdrawal was already planned when the scheme was introduced and because of the cast number plates, it was not considered cost effective to renumber the locomotives. Some class members did run with the "D" of their number painted over – TOPS classification removed the need for locomotives to indicate their energy type in the running number (D = Diesel, E = Electric).

When the display of destination headcodes on the front of trains was dropped in 1976, the instruction was given for them all to be set to "0000". On many Westerns, the headcode was set to display the locomotive's number in contravention of this directive and most surviving members of the class ran like this until they were scrapped. If used for routing, such reporting numbers would be interpreted as a passenger express terminating on the Southern Region.

Liveries

Early liveries

When the initial batch of Westerns was being built in 1961–2, British Rail was considering a new unified corporate colour scheme but had not yet made a final decision on what it would be. As a result, some of the early locomotives were painted in experimental liveries: D1000 was rolled out of Swindon Works in November 1961 painted in a light brown livery which became known as Desert Sand. Initially the numbers, borne on the left hand cab when viewed from the side, were painted in white but soon individual numbers and letters, looking like they were cast but apparently made of wood, were fitted. This was in turn replaced by the final design of cast nameplate and numberplate; metal with a black background. This livery was later altered by the addition of a small yellow warning panel at each end and a black roof. The second locomotive, D1001 was delivered in an all-over maroon livery with yellow buffer beams and further locomotives D1002-D1004 in all-over green with small yellow warning panels. Remaining deliveries carried the all-over maroon livery, initially without yellow warning panels, but the latter were applied from new after D1010 of the Swindon-built, and D1043 of the Crewe-built locomotives. Exceptions were the first four locomotives built at Crewe, D1035–D1038, which were delivered in green livery with red backgrounds to the nameplates, and D1015, which was outshopped from Swindon in an experimental "golden ochre" livery with small yellow warning panels at each end. On one end of this locomotive, the yellow panel was embellished by the addition of a yellow band which extended sideways from each of the top corners round onto the cabside for a short distance, resembling a T shape. The locomotive is not believed to have run in this condition, but was released to traffic in the golden ochre livery with standard small yellow panels.

Corporate scheme

After the adoption of Rail Blue with full yellow ends in 1966 (D1048 was the first of the class painted in this livery in 1966), for some unexplained reason a small batch of locomotives (D1017, D1030, D1036, D1037, D1043, D1047 and D1057) received this variant married to small yellow warning panels; D1030 carried red buffer beams for a short while. All other repaints were with full yellow ends which extended from the body line above the buffer beam up to the base of the window frames, along the sill of the cab-side windows onto the vertical end reveal. The valance above the cab windows on the front was also painted yellow, leaving the window frames in their base aluminium. The drive to repaint the locomotives in Rail Blue was outstripped by the safety directive dictating full yellow ends for all powered vehicles and some locomotives ran for a time with their original maroon bodies and full yellow ends.

The last locomotive to be repainted into Rail Blue was D1046, outshopped from Swindon in May 1971. Some early photographs of the blue livery give it a more metallic shade which is even more evident on the locomotives with small yellow panels. This however is possibly a photographic anomaly with colour film or due to printing techniques.

It is commonly accepted amongst Western enthusiasts in recent years that none of the class or any other British Rail locomotive of the period were ever painted with a metallic paint. However, several publications refer to initial painting in blue as being "chromatic blue" and published images do show a metallic sheen and lighter shade of blue than the standard Rail Blue.

Incidents 

 15 August 1963. Knowle and Dorridge rail crash. No. 1040 Western Queen collided with a freight train, crushing the cab and killing the three traincrew. The locomotive was repaired and returned to service.
 11 January 1967. St Annes Bristol rail crash. No. 1071 Western Renown in charge of the diverted 12:00 Paddington to Swansea collided with the rear of the 11:45 Paddington to Bristol hauled by No. 1067 Western Druid. The collision resulted in very severe damage being caused to the leading cab of locomotive No. 1071, but the three men in the cab escaped injury by moving into the centre of the locomotive. Nineteen passengers required first aid or medical treatment but there were no fatalities or serious injuries. The locomotive was repaired and returned to service.
 19 December 1973.  Ealing rail crash.  No. 1007 Western Talisman derailed while hauling an express passenger train, after an unlocked battery box door fell open, broke off and changed points under the locomotive. Ten people were killed. The locomotive did not return to service.
 29 January 1975 (Oxford). No. 1023 Western Fusilier derailed with a London Paddington to Birmingham train whilst approaching the platform. This was due to a failed axle which had split due to the growth of a previously undetected crack. There were no reported injuries and the locomotive was later preserved.
 3 January 1976 (Worcester Tunnel). No. 1055 Western Advocate crashed into a stationary parcels train killing the driver and guard of the Western. The locomotive did not return to service.
 4 October 1976 (Stoke Canon, Exeter). No. 1001 Western Pathfinder was working an overnight parcels train from London Paddington to  when the train was in collision with a workers' van at a level crossing. One workman in the van died in the accident. The locomotive was removed to Exeter St Davids depot. Despite sustaining relatively minor damage, the imminent demise of the entire fleet of Class 52's resulted in condemnation of the locomotive. Up to this point, Western Pathfinder had been a serious contender for preservation.

Preservation 

Seven locomotives have survived into preservation at heritage railways. Two have run on the mainline in preservation with D1015 been passed to operate on the mainline since 2002. D1062 made a brief appearance in 1980 during the Rocket 150 parade at Rainhill.

D1022 Western Sentinel was a candidate for preservation and was planned to be purchased by the DTG (Diesel Traction Group), but it was scrapped. D1015 Western Champion was purchased for preservation.

Model railways 
The first model of a Class 52 was produced by Trix (company) to its unusual compromise scale of 3.8mm to 1ft with OO gauge/HO gauge (16.5mm) track. This model, however, was quite crude.

In 1979 Hornby Railways launched its first version of the BR Class 52 (type 4) Western in OO gauge.

Lima (models) also produced a model to OO gauge.

An N gauge model was produced by Graham Farish.

Since then, OO gauge models have been produced by both Heljan, and most recently Dapol, whilst an O gauge model has been produced by Heljan. Dapol have also produced a model in N gauge.

See also
Krauss-Maffei ML 2200 C'C', Renfe Class 340, contemporary twin engined, twin transmission C'C' diesel hydraulic locomotives
Voith Maxima, modern (2000s) single engined, single transmission high power diesel hydraulic locomotive

References

Sources

Further reading

 
 
 
 
 
 
 
 
 
 
 

52
C-C locomotives
52
Railway locomotives introduced in 1961
Standard gauge locomotives of Great Britain
C′C′ locomotives